2016 Cerezo Osaka season.

Squad
As of 19 February 2016.

Senior

J2 League

Under 23

J3 League

References

External links
 J.League official site

Cerezo Osaka
Cerezo Osaka seasons